FC Torpedo Minsk (PFK Tarpeda Minsk) is a Belarusian football club, playing in Minsk. The team plays their home games at the Torpedo Stadium in Minsk, which holds 4,800 people. They currently play in Belarusian Second League.

History 

During Soviet years, Torpedo was playing in the Belarusian SSR top league and won championships in 1947, 1962, 1966, 1967 and 1969.

The team was playing in the Belarusian Premier League since 1992. Their most successful years were in the early 2000s, when the team finished in 4th position twice in a row (2002, 2003) and reached the final of the Belarusian Cup (2000).

In early 2005, Torpedo-SKA lost financial support from their sponsor and, after losing almost all their main squad and not having funds to pay entrance fee for next season's Premiere League, had to relegate to the Second League. Torpedo-SKA won the Second League in 2005, but at the end of the season, the club was disbanded. The owner moved to a new football team, named FC Minsk (legally a successor of Smena Minsk), which also used the same office and stadium as disbanded Torpedo-SKA. Only one player from Torpedo-SKA 2005 squad joined Minsk.

In 2007, the team was reformed as Torpedo-MAZ and started playing in Minsk championship, which is a part of KFK, Belarusian amateur league (4th lever in league pyramid). In 2009, the team finished in 3rd position and was eligible to represent Minsk in the final tournament for two promotion spots to the Second League (as the first two teams either declined or weren't eligible), but finished on the 3rd position. Successful performance in Minsk championship and cup allowed them to qualify for Belarusian Cup twice (2009 and 2010), but they were eliminated from the tournament after the first game both times.

In 2014, the team rejoined Belarusian Second League under their original name Torpedo Minsk, and in the following year was won the promotion into Belarusian First League. In 2018, they were promoted to the Belarusian Premier League as a replacement for Krumkachy Minsk, who had their Premier League license revoked due to debts.

Midway through the 2019 season, Torpedo withdrew from the Premier League due to lack of financing. All their remaining matches were forfeited 0–3 in favor of their opponents.

Name change
1947: Torpedo
1999: Torpedo-MAZ
2003: Torpedo-SKA
2005: disbanded
2007: Torpedo-MAZ
2014: Torpedo

Honours
 Belarusian Cup
 Runners-up (1): 2000

 Football Championship of the Belarusian SSR
 Winners (7): 1947, 1948, 1949, 1962, 1966, 1967, 1969
 Runners-up (4): 1950, 1963, 1968, 1983

League and Cup history

References

External links
Official website 
[https://vk.com/tarpedaminsk/ VK profile 

1947 establishments in Belarus
Association football clubs established in 1947
Football clubs in Minsk